2019 Nations League may refer to:
 2019–20 CONCACAF Nations League, a North American association football tournament.
2019–20 CONCACAF Nations League qualifying
 2018–19 UEFA Nations League, a European association football tournament.
2019 UEFA Nations League Finals, final rounds of the tournament.
2019 UEFA Nations League Final, final match of the tournament.